Jawhar Glass (born January 18, 1980), better known by his stage name Illogic, is an American indie hip hop artist from Columbus, Ohio. He has collaborated with many artists—particularly Blueprint, who has produced three of his albums, but also Aesop Rock, Vast Aire, Eyedea, Copywrite, Slug, and other MCs. His style has been described as having "a classically metered flow" with "deep lyrics and poetic verses."

History
Illogic began his career in freestyle battles and became the Columbus champion in 1997. He released his first four albums with Weightless Recordings which established himself as a forerunner of the indie rap boom. Illogic then moved to the Dove Ink label which he ran with his friend Eyamme until his return to Weightless Recordings in 2009 for Diabolical Fun accompanied by Ill Poetic.

In 2012, he released an EP titled Preparing for Capture, which was entirely produced by Blockhead in preparation for their upcoming full-length album, Capture the Sun. Speaking on the collaboration, Illogic said, "We have worked hard to really try to find our own identity as a duo and not to try recreate what I've done with other producers and what he has done with other artists." After the success of Preparing for Capture, they proceeded to release a sequel to the EP, Preparing for Capture 2.

Discography

Albums
 Unforeseen Shadows (2000)
 Got Lyrics? (2001)
 Celestial Clockwork (2004)
 Diabolical Fun (2009)
 Capture the Sun (2013) (with Blockhead)
 Bend But Don't Break (2013) (with Blueprint, as Greenhouse)
 Blank Eyes (2016)
 A Man Who Thinks With His Own Mind (2016) (with Ill2lectual )
 "Lucid Logic" (with Lucid Optics)
 Autopilot (2020)
 The Transition (2022)

Extended plays
 Write to Death Volume 1: My Hand Hurts (2003)
 Write to Death Volume 2: The Missing Pieces (2006)
 One Bar Left (2008)
 Preparing for Capture 1 (2012) (with Blockhead)
 Preparing for Capture 2 (2012) (with Blockhead)
 After Capture (2013) (with Blockhead)
 Something in the Water (2014) (with Ill2lectual)

Guest appearances
 Doseone - "Blur" from Hemispheres (1998)
 Clouddead - "Apt. A" from Clouddead (2000)
 Aesop Rock - "One Brick" from Labor Days (2001)
 Blueprint - "Who Do You Love?" from Adventures in Counter-Culture (2011)
 Copywrite - "Sorrow" from God Save the King (2012)

References

External links
 Official website

Living people
African-American male rappers
African-American songwriters
Underground rappers
1980 births
Midwest hip hop musicians
Rappers from Columbus, Ohio
Songwriters from Ohio
21st-century American rappers
21st-century American male musicians
Greenhouse (music group) members
21st-century African-American musicians
20th-century African-American people
American male songwriters